Killarney is a municipality located on the northern shore of Georgian Bay in the Sudbury District of Ontario, Canada. Killarney is commonly associated with Killarney Provincial Park, which is a large wilderness park located to the east of the townsite which occupies much of the municipality's expanded boundary. In addition to the community of Killarney itself, the communities of Hartley Bay and Bigwood, and the ghost towns of French River, Collins Inlet and Key Harbour, are also located within the municipal boundaries. The eastern end of the La Cloche Mountain Range is also located within the municipality of Killarney.

History

Killarney's established community was founded in 1820 by Etienne De La Morandiere (although indigenous peoples were living there prior), a French Canadian originally from Varennes, Quebec and a fur trader in Sault St Marie, Michigan, along with his wife Josette Sai Sai Go No Kwe, an indigenous woman from Michigan and a close relative of Chief Kitchi, meaning Big Gun. Soon after the arrival of the De La Morandieres, many French Canadian families started to settle in Killarney, including the Proulxs and the Roques, starting many fishing businesses in the process. Although there was already an existing settlement here at that time, they are credited with the founding of the settlement.

The population increased when the logging industry took off in Colins Inlet in the late 1800s. Hundreds of people from around Ontario went to Colins Inlet for work and established a large community in the area. The logging industry collapsed in the early 1900s because of the low demand and the population declined. Remains of the large village can be seen across from the present-day Mill Lake lodge.

Another key industry that had a major impact on Killarney's economy was the fishing industry. There were many fishing companies in Killarney including C.W.L (Charles William Low), The Nobles, Charles Low/Joseph Roque partnership, and Albert Lowe. The collapse of the fishing industry at the end of the 1950s affected many families in Killarney including the Low, Roque, Jackman, Proulx, and Herbert families. Recreational fishing was also an industry. A fishing camp was run by the Fruehauf Trailer Company out of Detroit, Michigan. Roy Fruehauf, president of the company from 1949 to 1961, was primarily responsible for operating Killarney Mountain Lodge. Clients and guests would be flown in via Mallard sea planes for vacations during the warmer summer months.

A quarry in Killarney Bay had fixed this issue for many families by creating more employment opportunities in the area. The quarry is located on the westside of the Landsdowne channel and had been very financially efficient after the downfall of the fishing industry.The quarry eventually was shut down in 2016 over a labour dispute and the industry that replaced it was tourism.

The major tourism businesses in Killarney were the Killarney mountain lodge, the Sportsmans Inn, the Killarney Bay Inn, the Pines Inn, Herbert fisheries, and Pitfield's General Store. The booming tourism industry brought hundreds of thousands of dollars to the businesses of Killarney as well as the many families that contributed to it. The current tourism businesses of Killarney include the Killarney Mountain Lodge, the Sportsmans Inn, Gateway Marina, Aunt Beas Corner Kitchen, Herbert fisheries, and Pitfield's General Store.

When and why the place name Shebahonaning was changed to Killarney is unknown. Lady Dufferin, wife of the Governor-General of Canada, has often been credited with the name change, but the passage in her journal which describes their stop in Killarney is dated 1874—almost twenty years after the Post Office had replaced the Shebahonaning postal stamp with one reading Killarney.

In July 1962, Highway 637 was established, connecting Killarney to major highways like Highway 69 and Highway 17, making it easier for people to travel to major cities like Toronto or Sudbury.  Before that, the people of the town had to either go by boat in the summer to Little Current and then take a train to Sudbury or other areas to obtain food and resources or by horse and buggy in the winter.

The current municipality was incorporated on January 1, 1999, when the Ontario provincial government expanded the boundaries of the township of Rutherford and George Island, the former governing body of the community of Killarney. The municipality was also transferred from the Manitoulin District to the Sudbury District at that time. In 2006, the municipality was enlarged again when it annexed the unorganized mainland portion of Manitoulin District.

Geography
The larger municipality of Killarney now encompasses virtually all of Killarney Provincial Park and the French River delta, and in fact extends all the way to Highway 69, over 70 kilometres from the townsite. Despite the municipality's geographic size, most of its population continues to reside in the community of Killarney itself, although smaller settlements also exist at Hartley Bay and Bigwood.

Demographics

Economy

The Killarney area's economy is based primarily on tourism, consisting mainly of wilderness lodges, campgrounds and retail services geared toward campers and other visitors to Killarney Provincial Park.  There were also many fishing companies in Killarney.

Tourism businesses in Killarney includ Killarney Mountain Lodge.

Attractions

 Killarney Provincial Park
 Killarney Provincial Park Observatory
 Killarney Centennial Museum

Government
The mayor is Michael Reider, and councillors are Mary Bradbury, Rob Campbell, Doug Elliott, Dave Froats, Mike Green, Nicola Grubic, and Peggy Roqu.

Although not officially part of the Sudbury East region, Killarney participates in the regional Sudbury East Planning Board with the municipalities of French River, St. Charles and Markstay-Warren.

Infrastructure

Transportation
Killarney is accessible from Highway 637. Killarney Airport is located in the municipality.

See also
List of townships in Ontario

References

External links  

 

Municipalities in Sudbury District
Populated places on Lake Huron in Canada
Single-tier municipalities in Ontario
Company towns in Canada
Fruehauf Trailer Corporation